Villeconin is a commune in the Essonne department, the region of Île-de-France, the north of France.

See also
Communes of the Essonne department

References

External links

Mayors of Essonne Association 

Communes of Essonne